was an indoor sporting arena located in the Ariake neighborhood of Tokyo, Japan. The capacity of the arena is 1,246 seats and it was opened in 1999. It was mainly used for professional wrestling and martial arts events. The arena became known as the home of Pro Wrestling Noah, housing the promotion's offices and training dojo.

The arena may be reached on a short walk from either Ariake Tennis no Mori Station on the New Transit Yurikamome or Kokusai-Tenjijō Station on the Rinkai Line.

Differ Ariake closed in June 2018. And it was replaced by newly build Ariake Arena for 2020 Summer Olympics and 2020 Summer Paralympics

References

External links
Official Site (Japanese)

Defunct indoor arenas in Japan
Sports venues in Tokyo
Boxing venues in Japan
Buildings and structures in Koto, Tokyo
Sports venues completed in 1999
1999 establishments in Japan
2018 disestablishments in Japan